The 1949 Chicago Cardinals season was the franchise's 30th season in the National Football League.  The Cardinals missed the postseason for the first time since 1946. This season was the last time the Cardinals beat the Green Bay Packers on the road until 2018.

Regular season

Schedule

Standings

Roster

Awards and records

References

Cardinals on Pro Football Reference

Chicago Cardinals
Arizona Cardinals seasons
Chicago Card